"Dandy" is a 1966 song by the Kinks, appearing on their album Face to Face.

Release and reception
"Dandy" was only released in Britain and America on the Face to Face album. However, it was released as a single in continental Europe, where it charted, reaching #1 in Germany, #2 in Belgium #3 in the Netherlands and #6 in Austria. In some countries, (such as Norway) "Dandy" was flipped with "Party Line" (also from Face to Face) as the A-side.

AllMusic'''s Stewart Mason said of "Dandy" that "Davies delivers the lyrics, about a neighborhood lothario, with just the right mixture of disgust and admiration; his slyly witty vocals are truly what makes the song. Musically, the tune harks back to the music hall tradition of George Formby; Dave Davies' guitar is so trebly and clean that it sounds like a ukulele – or perhaps an electrified rubber band – and the gently swinging tune sounds like it could have been an old vaudeville hit. 'Dandy' is a charming, slightly subversive, gem." Stephen Thomas Erlewine, also from AllMusic, noted "the music hall shuffle of 'Dandy'" as a "wonderful moment" from Face to Face.

'Dandy' was a regular feature of the Kinks live act from 1966 to 1969 but was dropped thereafter.

 Cover versions 
 Herman's Hermits 

"Dandy" became a hit single in North America in 1966 as recorded by fellow UK group Herman's Hermits in that same time frame, reaching #1 in Canada on the RPM national singles chart and #5 in the US on the Billboard Hot 100. It also made #3 in New Zealand. This version was not released as a single in the UK.

When comparing the Kinks' original version of "Dandy" to Herman's Hermits' cover, Stewart Mason of AllMusic said, "Herman's Hermits would have the US hit with Ray Davies' 'Dandy,' but the Kinks' own version, from 1966's masterful Face To Face, is far superior to Peter Noone's charming but gormless rendition."  Cash Box'' called the Herman's Hermits' version "a delectable item."

Other versions
The Rockin' Vickers also released "Dandy" as the A side to a 1966 single.  (Their main claim to fame was that Lemmy was a band member before his stint with Hawkwind and his formation of Motörhead.)  British singer Clinton Ford also released a version of the song as a single in the same year.

The Kinks' Pye Records label mate David Garrick included the song on his 1967 album "A Boy Named David", as well as a live version on the 1968 German release "David Garrick and the Dandys - Blow-Up Live".

Charts

Notes

References

Sources

 
 

1966 singles
Number-one singles in Germany
The Kinks songs
Herman's Hermits songs
Song recordings produced by Shel Talmy
Song recordings produced by Mickie Most
Songs written by Ray Davies
RPM Top Singles number-one singles
Pye Records singles
MGM Records singles
1966 songs